Munti Hirka (Ancash Quechua munti tree, hirka mountain, "tree mountain", also spelled Montejirca) is a mountain in the eastern extensions of the Wallanka mountain range in the Andes of Peru which reaches a height of approximately . It is located in the Ancash Region, Bolognesi Province, Huallanca District.

References

Mountains of Peru
Mountains of Ancash Region